Pingalla is a genus of freshwater fish in the family Terapontidae. These fish are native to northern Australia, but one species is also known from New Guinea.

Species include:
Pingalla gilberti (Whitley, 1955) - Gilbert's grunter
Pingalla lorentzi (Weber, 1910) - Lorentz's grunter
Pingalla midgleyi (Allen & Merrick, 1984) - black-blotch grunter

References

 
Terapontidae
Taxonomy articles created by Polbot